Reality Simulations Incorporated (RSI) is a game company in Tempe, Arizona, USA, that publishes and runs play-by-mail games.

History
Founded by Paul W. Brown III and Charles Kraver in 1984, the company runs several commercial play-by-mail (PBM) games, including Duel2 (previously called Duelmasters), Hyborian War, first published in 1985, and Forgotten Realms: War of the Avatars. The company previously ran the PBM games The Next Empire, initially published by Cyborg Games, and Alamaze, initially published by Pegasus Productions. The company stated in 1993 that there were over 3,000 people playing RSI PBM games, which included, at the time, Duelmasters, Hyborian War, and The Next Empire.

In the Nov/Dec 1996 issue of Paper Mayhem magazine, RSI tied for third place in its list of the Best PBM companies of 1996.

List of games 
 Duel2
 Hyborian War
 Forgotten Realms: War of the Avatars

See also
 List of play-by-mail games

References

External links 
 Terrablood's PBM Archives Info and data for fans of the play-by-mail games Duel II, Forgotten Realms, and Hyborian War from Reality Simulations, Inc
 Road of Kings: A Hyborian War Players Forum Coordinates with Reality Simulations in setting up Organized Games

Companies based in Tempe, Arizona
Play-by-mail game publishing companies